The Matthews-Bradshaw House is a historic house at 524 Skyline Drive in North Little Rock, Arkansas.  It is a single-story masonry structure, its exterior clad in brick and stone.  A conical turreted section with diamond-pane windows projects from one corner, and the gable above the main entrance is finished in half-timbered stucco.  Built in 1929 by the Justin Matthews Company as part of its Park Hill development, it is the only example Matthews built of the French Eclectic style.  It was designed by Frank Carmean, the Matthews Company architect.

The house was listed on the National Register of Historic Places in 1992.

See also
National Register of Historic Places listings in Pulaski County, Arkansas

References

Houses on the National Register of Historic Places in Arkansas
Houses completed in 1929
Houses in North Little Rock, Arkansas
National Register of Historic Places in Pulaski County, Arkansas